is a Japanese idol and talent who is a former member of AKB48's Team B.

Ōya is represented with Watanabe Entertainment.

AKB48 participation

Singles

Albums

Stage units

Filmography

Variety

Other TV programmes

TV dramas

Radio

Stage

Events

Bibliography

Calendars

References

Notes

External links
Official member profiles 
Watanabe Entertainment profile 
Watanabe Girls profile 
 

AKB48 members
Japanese idols
Japanese television personalities
People from Fukutsu, Fukuoka
Musicians from Fukuoka Prefecture
1991 births
Living people
Weather presenters
Watanabe Entertainment